The Saegheh is an Iranian anti-personnel RPG-7 warhead. It was developed to extend the utility of the RPG-7 portable rocket-propelled grenade (RPG) in service with the Iranian forces. It replaces the standard 30mm warhead with a
high-explosive 40mm warhead with prefragmented steel warhead body.

Specifications

Calibre: 40 mm
Weight: rocket, 1.4 kg; warhead, 1.1 kg
Length: rocket, 590 mm; warhead, 310 mm
Max velocity: 150 m/s
Max range: 1,800 m

See also
RPG-7
Military of Iran
Iranian military industry
Current Equipment of the Iranian Army
Historical Equipment of the Iranian Army

References

Islamic Republic of Iran Army
Anti-tank rockets